The River is a South African telenovela created by Phathu Makwarela and Gwydion Beynon. It is an M-Net original production produced by Tshedza Pictures for DStv's general entertainment subscription channel 1Magic and is available for streaming on Naspers' subscription-based video-on-demand service Showmax. From 2019 reruns began airing on Mzansi Magic, broadcasting weekdays (from Monday to Friday) at 19:00 and other older reruns on Mzansi Wethu, broadcasting weekdays at 20:00 since 2021. In 2021, series lead Sindi Dlathu was announced as co-executive producer for the show's fourth season.
In November 2021, The River was renewed for season 5 which premiered on 7 February 2022. The River was renewed for a 6th and final season which premiered on 6 February 2023 and Siyabonga Thwala is set to join the cast of The River for season 6 as he makes his debut on the 10th February 2023 as Bangizwe Zwane , an astute and successful businessman.

The River stars Sindi Dlathu, Presley Chweneyagae, Siyabonga Thwala, Tsholofelo Matshaba, Tinah Mnumzazane, Thembinkosi Mthembu, Bheki Mkhwane and Brenda Mhlongo. It co-stars Lunga Mofokeng, Lunathi Mampofu, Galaletsang Koffman, Matshepo Sekgopi, Thapelo Sebogodi, Thapelo Ramotshehla, Siya Sepotokele, Chuck Shisane Wa Sekgobela, Linda Mtoba, Nokuthula Ledwaba and Tina Dlathu

The drama series is set in Pretoria against the backdrop of South Africa's mining sector. A diamond discovery in the river running between the poor township of Refilwe and the affluent neighbourhood of Silver Lakes quickly turns from a blessing to a curse.

Plot 
The River tells the story of Khanyisa Diamonds mine owner, and the extent she will go to in order to protect her family and maintain her lavish lifestyle. Lindiwe is married to provincial police commissioner Zweli Dikana, and is a mother to Andile and Mbali Dikana, step-mother to Nomonde Dikana. The Dikanas live in a mansion in Pretoria East, South Africa.

In the township of Refilwe, where Khanyisa Diamonds is located, live poverty stricken residents, many of whom work at the mine. The Mokoena family, consisting of Malefu Mokoena and her children, Thuso, Dimpho and Itumeleng, live in Refilwe. Unbeknownst to everyone except Malefu, Tumi is adopted, having been found at a river as a baby by her late adoptive father, Thato Mokoena.

Season 1 
Lindiwe's mine is about to go bankrupt when foreman Thato Mokoena finds an alluvial diamond, whose worth is later revealed to be $45 million, in the river that runs through the township of Refilwe while fishing. Lindiwe murders Thato Mokoena and places the diamond in her mine for her miners to find, so that the discovery is made on her land, while also covering up the murder. Zweli's long lost daughter, Nomonde, becomes Lindiwe's enemy over time.

Malefu Mokoena struggles to raise her children after her husband's death. Her oldest son, Thuso, is frequently in and out of jail. Her adopted daughter, Tumi, marries Lindiwe's nephew, Zolani Dlamini, and moves into the matlou household. Following their wedding, Lindiwe employs Tumi as the CSR Officer at Khanyisa Diamonds. Lindiwe attempts to steal the land in Refilwe to mine, but her plan is foiled when Tumi dissents, realising Lindiwe's intentions.

Malefu discovers Tumi had a hand in Lindiwe's plan. Malefu disowns Tumi and tells her she was adopted, and gives Tumi half of a necklace her birth mother left her with. Tumi divorces Zolani, who reveals that Lindiwe killed her father. Tumi and her new boyfriend, Lindani, attempt to find evidence by returning to the Dikana mansion. While searching Lindiwe's desk, Tumi discovers Lindiwe is her biological mother. Tumi attempts to reach Lindiwe so they can talk, but is kidnapped and taken to the mine, where she is buried alive by Lindiwe, who knows that Zolani told Tumi of Thato Mokoena's murder.

Lindiwe finds Tumi's message and realising she has buried her own child, attempts suicide by shooting herself.

Season 2 
Tumi is rescued by Lindani, while Lindiwe makes a full recovery. Tumi subsequently files charges against Lindiwe. Her quest for justice turns sour, as she becomes the prime suspect in the attempted murder of Lindiwe. Subsequently, Lindiwe files charges against Tumi, arguing in court that Tumi is an agent of white monopoly capital sent to destroy her company. Lindiwe is sent to jail

Lindiwe frees Paulina from prison in exchange for Lindani's silence in order to win the case. She is found not guilty. Little that she know, Christo told Zweli that Lindiwe did commit the crimes and she paid him off to support the fact that she was targeted by Johaan Scheepers and his extinct gang. The prophet was right; she may have won the case, but she lost her family. Her husband then wakes up and smells the coffee, he asks her for a divorce and tells her that everything is to stay with him and the kids and she's to leave immediately (with Zolani). He then exiles her to a life of poverty as punishment.

Reeling from her parents' divorce and her mother's disappearance, Mbali resorts to drugs and is kidnapped by her dealer. Nomonde takes over as the CEO of Khanyisa Diamonds and Zweli turns to a prostitute for company.

After rescuing Mbali, Zweli informs his children of Lindiwe's misdeeds. In Refilwe, Cobra and Paulina contest an interim ward election after the councillor dies from a heart attack. Paulina is set to win until Percy and Oupa plant fake votes in favour of Thuso, also known as Cobra.

Cobra wins the election and invites Paulina to join the council. Lindiwe resurfaces in Refilwe and takes up refuge in the shack she grew up in. Every one of her contacts abandon her when they realise she has lost her power. Tumi finds out Lindiwe is in Refilwe and sets her shack on fire, with Lindiwe inside. Zolani rescues Lindiwe and Sis Flora takes them in out of pity.

Lindiwe pretends to have turned over a new leaf and misleads everyone into believing she is a changed person, as she bides her time and calculates her return. Cobra uses his position as councillor to unfairly award tenders. Nomonde struggles to keep the mine afloat while juggling her relationship with Lindani. After Nomonde is nearly killed by the miners, she begins looking for a new CEO for Khanyisa Diamonds.

Gail Mathabatha (Mary Ann Barlow) enters the lives of the Dikanas when she is hired as Khanyisa's new CEO. Soon she is involved in a romantic relationship with Zweli to Lindiwe's chagrin, setting the latter on a quest for everything she holds dear - her family, her marriage and her mine. She is later killed by Lindiwe on her wedding day.

Zweli is now seen in a wheelchair and Lindiwe begins helping him get better, even if he never asks her for help. Zweli then asks Lindiwe to marry him again. She later gets revenge on those who turned their backs on her when she needed them the most. Zweli later gets his own kids arrested, because they accommodated a wanted criminal in the mansion, and Tumi and Lindiwe finally began reconciling as mother and daughter and married her childhood sweetheart, Lindani.

Thuso together with Percy and Oupa successfully steal Lindiwe's diamonds at the diamond launch which was disrupted by riots. Thuso gives the diamonds to Lindani, who is now Tumi's husband, so that he doesn't get caught by police as he knows that he will be the prime suspect.

Lindani can't keep such a secret, so he tells his friend Charlie about the stolen diamonds. Lindiwe and Zolani brutally torture Charlie for information about the stolen diamonds. They get the information they needed, go to Lindani's house and find the stolen diamonds. A drunk and depressed Lindani enters the house and is immediately shot by Lindiwe.

Tumi and Mbali overhear a conversation between Lindiwe and Zolani celebrating their successful mission. Tumi plans on revenge by tampering with the car's brakes. Mbali cries and fears that her mother is what people call her. She takes her mother's car which has had the brakes tampered with, so by mistakenly dies in a tragic accident.

Season 3
Season 3 starts with the confusion and heartbreak of Tumi. Lindiwe feels that she is being punished for her sins. Mbali's funeral is held. Zolani finds love with a girl called Emma. When she realises that he is just an employee of Lindiwe, she persuades him to sue, causing conflict between the two. Zolani finds out about Emma's lies and breaks up with her. Zolani and Lindiwe fix their relationship.

A woman from Cobra's past comes with his son, Morena. Morena steals from the residents of Refilwe but Cobra doesn't believe them until he steals from Dimpho. Andile's boyfriend Njabulo comes back with a friend, Mondli. Mondli and Njabulo are in a relationship and Andile breaks up with him. Andile has an attempted suicide and he and Njabulo get back together. Mabutho and Tumi begin an affair and Andile finds out about it. Tumi breaks it off and walks out of her and Lindani's bedroom. The Dikanas and Lindani are downstairs and see them. Mabutho admits that he and Tumi are in love.

Emma came back from where she was hiding and she was pregnant with Zolani's baby. He and Lindiwe were sceptical but after DNA tests proved that he is the father, Zolani asked Emma to marry him much to Lindiwe's dismay.

An old ex of Lindiwe and friend of Thato Mokoena named Mohumi came to seek revenge on Lindiwe for betraying him and to avenge Thato's death. He and his rebels held Lindiwe and her family hostage and wanted to kill Tumi. As he was about to kill Tumi Lindiwe confessed that she is Tumi's father.

After Mohumi was arrested Tumi started visiting him and Lindiwe instructed one of her allies to plant listening devices in her room. While visiting Mohumi in hospital, Tumi told Mohumi that she killed Mbali. Tshabalala showed Lindiwe the recording and she was distraught. Lindiwe forgave Tumi and they reconciled. Tumi stopped visiting Mohumi and Lindiwe went to his prison cell to gloat and she admitted to killing Happy, Sheree and Gail. Unknowingly to Lindiwe, Mohumi was recording her. He sent Tumi the recording and told her to post it on social media. Tumi showed Lindiwe the recording and she and Tshabalala went to his prison cell to take his phone.

Season 3 ended at Zolani and Emma's wedding. Tumi was in a helicopter and she wanted to tell the truth about Lindiwe's crimes at the wedding. Lindiwe called her from the venue and tried to talk her out of telling the truth. She took Tshabalala and they drove to the helicopter pad where the helicopter was meant to land. Lindiwe calculated that Sis Flora was gonna find out about Happy and Zweli was gonna find out about Gail. Lindiwe took Tshabalala's gun and shot at the helicopter as it was about to land. The helicopter exploded with Tumi inside it.

Season 4  
Tumi dies they buried her Elvis wakes up and remembers what happened and how Tumi died and is threatening lindiwe to marry him and if anything happens to him Zweil has a letter of what happened. Some blesser is blessing Paulina with stock and money. Zolani shot Elvis but he was wearing a bullet proof vest. There are rumours around Refilwe about the blesser being said it's Cobra. Elvis later comes to Dikana mansion and pretends not to have information about the accident but asks Zweli for protection from the killers.

Cobra keeps making people think he is a blesser; he later gets arrested for ATM bombing. Lindiwe offers Elvis money to leave the Mansion and he eventually agreed. Zweli keeps investigating the death of Tumi but still no traces. Cobra gets released later, then found out that Khabzela and Mabutho are the Blessers. Lindiwe hunts Elvis down at a hotel and kills him with a poison condom. Zweli starts to be suspicious about Lindiwe not being moved by anything that has happened. Zweli finds out about Lindiwe killing Tumi and that causes conflict between the two of them. The sort things out and a girl enters Zweli's life, Nyakallo. Nyakallo is sis'Flora's niece and Nyakallo and Zweli start having an affair leading them to marriage. Lindiwe kills Nyakallo in a train and Zweli and Lindiwe fix their relationship. Mohumi comes back and turning on a new leaf. He and the community reconcile turning Mohumi into a brand new citizen.
In the season finale the Refilwe communication was trying to kill him for holding them hostage in Lindiwe's house. Lindiwe saved him in exchange for signing back her mine. Lindiwe betrays him by pushing him out of the helicopter in the River

Cast shown on opening scene
Season 1
Presley Chweneyagae as Thuso Mokoena 
Moshidi Motshegwa as Malefu Mokoena
Hlomla Dandala as Zweli Dikana
Lawrence Maleka as Zolani Dlamini
Lunga Shabalala as Lindani Dlomo
Larona Moagi as Tumi Mokoena
Sindi Dlathu as Lindiwe Dlamini - Dikana
Season 2
Presley Chweneyagae as Thuso Mokoena
Tina Mnumzana as Flora Moloi
Hlomla Dandala as Zweli Dikana
Lawrence Maleka as Zolani Dlamini
Lunga Shabalala as Lindani Dlomo
Larona Moagi as Tumi Mokoena-Dlomo
Sindi Dlathu as Lindiwe Dlamini - Dikana
Season 3
Presley Chweneyagae as Thuso Mokoena
Tina Mnumzana as Flora Moloi
Hlomla Dandala as Zweli Dikana
Lawrence Maleka as Zolani Dlamini
Lunga Shabalala as Lindani Dlomo
Larona Moagi as Tumi Dlomo
Sindi Dlathu as Lindiwe Dlamini - Dikana
Season 4
Presley Chweneyagae as Thuso Mokoena
Tina Mnumzana as Flora Moloi
Hlomla Dandala as Zweli Dikana
Lawrence Maleka as Zolani Dlamini
Thembinkosi Mthembu as Mabutho Dimba
Tsholofelo Matshaba as Kedibone Mokoena
Sindi Dlathu as Lindiwe Dlamini - Dikana
Season 5
Presley Chweneyagae as Thuso Mokoena 
Tina Mnumzana as Flora Moloi
Hlomla Dandala as Zweli Dikana
Lawrence Maleka as Zolani Dlamini
Thembinkosi Mthembu as Mabutho Dimba
Tsholofelo Matshaba as Kedibone Mokoena
Sindi Dlathu as Lindiwe Dlamini - Dikana
Season 6
Presley Chweneyagae as Thuso Mokoena
Tina Mnumzana as Flora Moloi
Siyabonga Thwala as Bangizwe Zwane 
Bheki Mkhwane as Bukhosi Hlophe 
Brenda Mhlongo as Nomafu Hlophe 
Tsholofelo Matshaba as Kedibone Mokoena 
Sindi Dlathu as Lindiwe Dlamini

Cast and characters 

Former Cast

Cast Members
Season 1
Sindi Dlathu as Lindiwe Dlamini - Dikana 
Hlomla Dandala as Zweli Dikana 
Presley Chweneyagae as Thuso Mokoena 
Larona Moagi as Tumi Mokoena 
Moshidi Motshegwa as Malefu Mokoena
Lawrence Maleka as Zolani Dlamini 
Tinah Mnumzana as Flora Moloi
Andile Mofokeng as Andile Dikana 
Zenokuhle Maseko as Mbali Dikana
Matshepo Sekgopi as Dimpho Mokoena 
Lunga Shabalala as Lindani Dlomo 
Tango Ncetezo as Paulina Dlomo 
Galaletsang Koffman as Beauty 
Thapelo Sebogodi as Kabelo "Khabzela"
Mlangeni Nawa as Thato Mokoena 
Season 2
Sindi Dlathu as Lindiwe Dlamini - Dikana 
Hlomla Dandala as Zweli Dikana 
Presley Chweneyagae as Thuso Mokoena 
Larona Moagi as Tumi Mokoena - Dlomo
Lawrence Maleka as Zolani Dlamini 
Tinah Mnumzana as Florah Moloi 
Andile Mofokeng as Andile Dikana 
Zenokuhle Maseko as Mbali Dikana 
Matshepo Sekgopi as Dimpho Mokoena 
Lunga Shabalala as Lindani Dlomo 
Tango Ncetezo as Paulina Dlomo-Mokoena
Galaletsang Koffman as Beauty 
Thapelo Sebogodi as Kabelo "Khabzela"
Tsholo Matshaba as Kedibone Mokoena 
Season 3
Sindi Dlathu as Lindiwe Dlamini - Dikana 
Hlomla Dandala as Zweli Dikana 
Presley Chweneyagae as Thuso Mokoena 
Larona Moagi as Tumi Mokoena 
Lawrence Maleka as Zolani Dlamini 
Tinah Mnumzana as Florah Moloi 
Tsholo Matshaba as Kedibone Mokoena 
Thembinkosi Mthembu as Mabutho Dimba 
Andile Mofokeng as Andile Dikana 
Matshepo Sekgopi as Dimpho Mokoena 
Lunga Shabalala as Lindani Dlomo 
Tango Ncetezo as Paulina Dlomo 
Galaletsang Koffman as Beauty 
Thapelo Sebogodi as Khabzela 
Seputla Sebogodi as Mohumi Ditshweni
Season 4
Sindi Dlathu as Lindiwe Dlamini - Dikana 
Hlomla Dandala as Zweli Dikana 
Presley Chweneyagae as Thuso Mokoena 
Lawrence Maleka as Zolani Dlamini 
Tina Mnumzana as Florah Moloi 
Tsholo Matshaba as Kedibone Mokoena 
Thembinkosi Mthembu as Mabutho Dimba 
Andile Mofokeng as Andile Dikana 
Matshepo Sekgopi as Dimpho Mokoena 
Lunathi Mampofu as Emma Dlamini
Galaletsang Koffman as Beauty 
Thapelo Sebogodi as Kabelo (Khabzela)
Tango Ncetezo as Paulina Dlomo 
Thabiso Ramotshela as Morena Mokoena 
Seputla Sebogodi as Mohumi Ditshwele
Season 5
Sindi Dlathu as Lindiwe Dlamini - Dikana
Hlomla Dandala as Zweli Dikana 
Presley Chweneyagae as Thuso Mokoena 
Lawrence Maleka as Zolani Dlamini 
Tina Mnumzana as Florah Moloi 
Tsholo Matshaba as Kedibone Mokoena 
Thembinkosi Mthembu as Mabutho Dimba 
Bheki Mkhwane as Bukhosi Hlophe
Brenda Mhlongo as Nomafu Hlophe 
Unathi Mkhize as Nkanyiso Hlophe
Vuyo Biyela as Mlilo Hlophe 
Tinah Dlathu as Khwezi Hlophe 
Andile Mofokeng as Andile Dikana 
Matshepo Sekgopi as Dimpho Mokoena 
Lunathi Mampofu as Emma Dlamini
Linda Mtoba as Nomonde Dikana
Galaletsang Koffman as Beauty 
Thapelo Sebogodi as Khabzela
Tango Ncetezo as Paulina Dlomo 
Thabiso Ramotshela as Morena Mokoena 
Season 6
Sindi Dlathu as Lindiwe Dlamini - Dikana 
Presley Chweneyagae as Thuso Mokoena 
Siyabonga Thwala as Bangizwe Zwane
Tinah Mnumzana as Florah Moloi 
Tsholo Matshaba as Kedibone Mokoena 
Thembinkosi Mthembu as Mabutho Dimba 
Bheki Mkhwane as Bukhosi Hlophe 
Brenda Mhlongo as Nomafu Hlophe 
Unathi Mkhize as Nkanyiso Hlophe
Vuyo Biyela as Mlilo Hlophe 
Tinah Dlathu as Khwezi Hlophe 
Andile Mofokeng as Andile Dikana 
Matshepo Sekgopi as Dimpho Mokoena 
Lunathi Mampofu as Emma Dlamini 
Galaletsang Koffman as Beauty 
Thapelo Sebogodi as Khabzela 
Chuck Shinane as Detective Tshabalala
Linda Mtoba as Nomonde Dikana
Thabiso Ramotshela as Morena Mokoena 
Nokuthula Mavuso as Angelina Mthombeni

Guest stars

 Zenzo Ngqobe as Percival "MaPercente"
 Warren Masemola as Oupa Manamela
 Maduvha Madima as Minister Joyful
 Kennedy Stab as Goliath
 Mary Anne Barlow as Gail Mathabatha
 Sello Maake Ka-Ncube as Malome Sechaba
 Shannon Esra as Sandra Stein
 T.J. Mokhuane as Tshepo
 Shahan Ramkissoon as himself
 Masasa Mbangeni as Advocate Akhona
 Ntokozo Dlamini as Sihle Ngema
 Thabo Malema as Ten Ten
 Michelle Craig as a journalist
 Robert Whitehead as Judge Christoper Knowles
 Lebogang Tlokana as Dora Phakati
 Winnie Ntshaba as MaDlomo
 Nkanyiso Bhengu as Pastor
 Alina Moloi as Constable Candy

Awards and nominations

References

External links 
 
The River in TVSA

2020s South African television series
South African drama television series